The Love Unlimited Orchestra was a 40-piece string-laden orchestra formed by American singer Barry White, and serving as a backing unit for White and for female vocal trio Love Unlimited. From the early 1970s on, they also recorded several singles and albums under their own name.

Career
The orchestra was originally formed in 1972 to back White's female vocal group Love Unlimited for their debut album. The following year they began supporting White for his solo debut I've Got So Much to Give.

Their biggest hit was 1973's instrumental single "Love's Theme". The track, written by Barry White, went to number 1 for one week in the US and number 10 in the UK. The RIAA awarded a gold disc in February 1974. The hit was included on the orchestra's debut album Rhapsody in White issued in 1974. 

Two follow-up albums Together Brothers and White Gold were released later that year. White Gold featured the single "Satin Soul" which peaked at number 22 on the Billboard pop charts in early 1975. In 1976, Kenny Gorelick, later known as Kenny G, joined the orchestra as a saxophonist.

The orchestra continued to record albums for 20th Century Records until the end of the 1970s. By 1981, they had moved to White's own label Unlimited Gold. Their final album Rise was issued in 1983.

Discography

Albums

Singles

References

External links 

Discogs.com

American disco groups
American funk musical groups
Musical backing groups
Musical groups established in 1972
Musical groups disestablished in 1983
Musical groups from Los Angeles